Java OpenAL (JOAL) is one of several wrapper libraries that allows Java programmers to access OpenAL.  This allows Java programmers to use 3D sound in applications.  JOAL is one of the libraries developed by the Sun Microsystems Game Technology Group.  JOAL is released under a BSD license, and is available for Microsoft Windows, Mac OS X, and Linux.  Like its graphical counterpart, Java OpenGL (JOGL), JOAL was developed using the GlueGen utility, a program that generates Java bindings from C header files.
The official site on java.net was deleted in March 2011.  The JOAL project, however, is still alive in Jogamp.org JOAL.

External links

Download Link (2.0.2)
JNAL - An alternative, JNA-based Java wrapper for OpenAL

Audio libraries
Free audio software
Java (programming language) libraries
Java APIs
Software using the BSD license